Chloroclystis obturgescens is a moth in the family Geometridae. It was described by Prout in 1926. It is endemic to Borneo.

References

External links

Moths described in 1926
obturgescens
Endemic fauna of Borneo